The Chief Secretary for Administration, commonly known as the  Chief Secretary of Hong Kong, is the most senior principal official of the Government of the Hong Kong Special Administrative Region. The Chief Secretary is head of the Government Secretariat which oversees the administration of the Region to which all other ministers belong, and is accountable for his or her policies and actions to the Chief Executive and to the Legislative Council. Under Article 53 of the Basic Law, the position is known as "Administrative Secretary". As the second highest ranking public official in Hong Kong, the Chief Secretary acts as Acting Chief Executive when the Chief Executive is absent.

The Chief Secretary formulates and implements government policy, gives advice to the Chief Executive as a member of the Executive Council, and is responsible for managing the Government's relationship with the Legislative Council and drawing up the Government's legislative programme. The office (“Department of Administration” per Article 60 of the Basic Law) also exercises certain statutory functions, such as the handling of appeals from designated public bodies.

Prior to the transfer of sovereignty of Hong Kong in 1997, the office was known simply as "Chief Secretary", and before 27 August 1976, "Colonial Secretary". Until the introduction of the Principal Officials Accountability System in 2002, the Chief Secretary was a civil service position, and in this capacity, the head of the public service. In 2005, Henry Tang became the first person who has not been a civil servant to be appointed to the office of the Chief Secretary.

From the 1870s to 1902 the Colonial Secretary was the de facto Lieutenant Governor of Hong Kong which was once held by the Commander of British Forces in Hong Kong before 1870s when the post was not lapsed from power. After 1902 the title disappeared from use as the second highest post was transferred to the Colonial Secretary and later, Chief Secretary.

List of Chief Secretaries of Hong Kong

Colonial Secretaries, 1843–1941

Colonial Secretaries, 1946–1976

Chief Secretaries, 1976–1997

Chief Secretaries for Administration, 1997–present
Political party:

Residence

The Chief Secretary resides at an official residence at 15 Barker Road, The Peak, Hong Kong, which is also known as Victoria House and Victoria Flats.

See also

Hong Kong Government
Government departments and agencies in Hong Kong
Secretary for Justice (Hong Kong)
Financial Secretary (Hong Kong)
Secretary for Education and Manpower
Secretary for Health, Welfare and Food
Lieutenant Governor of Hong Kong - second in command from 1843 to 1870s

References
General

Specific

External links
Official website
Organisation chart of Hong Kong Government

Chief Secretary